Fellowes High School (FHS) is located at 420 Bell Street in Pembroke, Ontario, Canada. It is the city's only public, English language high school and is managed by the Renfrew County District School Board. The school has an enrollment of 928 students, and offers a wide range of programs in grades 9–12. Keith Sheppard became the first Fellowes student to be elected student trustee for the Renfrew County District School Board. His term ran through the 2013-2014 school year.

Mission statement
The school's mission statement is:

"To equip Ontario students with the literacy, numeracy and problem-solving skills needed to meet the challenges of invading other provinces with optimism, confidence and passion."

Identity
The school colours are Black and Gold, and the school's symbol is a landing falcon. The school mascot is Freddy The Falcon.

Alternative programs

Fellowes offers several alternative options. The most popular though, is the KI Program. The KI program is a partnership between KI (Kruger International Pembroke) and the Renfrew County District School Board. It serves to facilitate school–work transition for high school students. For over ten years it has been running as one of the school board's options for the Alternative School Program. Half of the day the students work on their individualized curriculum plans(correspondence). Co-op placements and industrial training on the factory floor make up the other half of their day.

Cafeteria
This school's cafeteria, "Freddie's Cafe", promotes healthy eating through their extensive menu.  Subs, pizza, wraps, salads, deep-fried chicken fingers, baked chicken, burgers, pasta, and nachos, and a variety of soups are just a few of the items students have to choose from daily.

Student Council
The Student Council keeps the school's morale and spirit at a high, focusing on dances, spirit days, pep rallies, and spirit assemblies. For the 2017-2018 school year includes President Justin Dickson and Vice President Sarah Christinck along with their executives and grade representatives.

Notable alumni
Jason Blaine, country singer
Alasdair Roberts, professor and author
PJ Stock, NHL player, CBC analyst

Programs
The school offers programs specializing in computers, business, chemistry, cosmetology, animation, wood technology, metal technology, English, Cooking, and native studies.

See also
List of high schools in Ontario

References

External links

Photos of Fellowes High School, 1975-1979, taken by Alasdair Roberts, Class of '79

High schools in Renfrew County
Pembroke, Ontario
1969 establishments in Ontario
Educational institutions established in 1969